LGBT themes in mythology occur in mythologies and religious narratives that include stories of romantic affection or sexuality between figures of the same sex or that feature divine actions that result in changes in gender. These myths are considered by some modern queer scholars to be forms of lesbian, gay, bisexual, or transgender (LGBT) expression, and modern conceptions of sexuality and gender have been retroactively applied to them. Many mythologies ascribe homosexuality and gender fluidity in humans to the action of gods or of other supernatural interventions.

The presence of LGBT themes in  mythologies has become the subject of intense study. The application of gender studies and queer theory to non-Western mythic tradition is less developed, but has grown since the end of the twentieth century.
Myths often include being gay, bisexual, or transgender as symbols for sacred or mythic experiences. Devdutt Pattanaik argues that myths "capture the collective unconsciousness of a people", and that this means they reflect deep-rooted beliefs
about variant sexualities that may be at odds with repressive social mores.

Critical perspective

The status of mythology varies by culture. Myths are generally believed to be literally true within the society that created them and deemed erroneous or fictitious elsewhere. Cultures may regard myths as containing psychological or archetypal truths. Myths may explain and validate the social institutions of a particular culture, as well as educate the members of that culture. This societal role has been posited for stories that included same-sex love, which educate people as to the correct attitude to adopt toward same-sex sexual activity and gender constructions.

Since the beginning of recorded history and in a multitude of cultures, myths, folklore and sacred texts have incorporated themes of same-sex eroticism and gender identity. Myths often include homosexuality, bisexuality or transgender themes as a symbol for sacred or mythic experiences. Homoeroticism or gender variance in myths have been analysed according to modern conceptions of LGBT identities and behaviours, for example, deities that disguise themselves as, or adopt behaviors traditional to, the opposite gender for a given culture may be called transgender, and beings with no reproductive organs or with both male and female organs may be called androgynous or intersex. Individual myths have been denoted "queer" for rejecting a heteronormative and binary view of gender. The queer interpretations may be based on only indirect evidence, such as an unusually close same-sex friendship or dedication to chastity. Such readings have been criticised for ignoring cultural context or mis-applying modern or Western preconceptions, for example in assuming that celibacy means only avoiding penetration or reproductive sex (hence allowing homoerotic sex), while ignoring the widespread beliefs in the spiritual potency of semen that mandate an avoidance of all sex.

Researchers have long recognised the presence of LGBT themes in Western mythologies, and have studied the subject intensely. The application of gender studies and queer theory to non-Western mythic tradition is less developed, but has grown since the end of the twentieth century. Devdutt Pattanaik writes that myths "capture the collective unconsciousness of a people", and that this means they reflect deep-rooted beliefs about variant sexualities that may be at odds with repressive social mores.

Many mythologies ascribe homosexuality and gender variance in humans to the action of gods or to other supernatural interventions. This include myths in which gods teach people about same-sex sexual practices by example, as in Aztec or Hawaiian mythology or myths that explain the cause for transgender identities or homosexuality, such as the story in which Prometheus accidentally creates some people with the wrong genitalia while drunk, or instances of reincarnation or possession by a spirit of the opposite gender in Voodoo.

It is common in polytheistic mythologies to find characters that can change gender, or have aspects of both male and female genders at the same time. Sexual activity with both genders is also common within such pantheons, and is compared to modern bisexuality or pansexuality. The creation myths of many traditions involve sexual, bisexual or androgynous motifs, with the world being created by genderless or hermaphrodite beings or through sexual congress between beings of the opposite or same apparent gender.

Mythologies of Africa

Egyptian
Few records of homosexuality exist in Egyptian mythology, and the written and pictorial works are reticent in representing sexualities. The sources that do exist indicate that same-sex relations were regarded negatively, and that penetrative sex was seen as an aggressive act of dominance and power, shameful to the receiver (a common view in the Mediterranean basin area).

The most well-known example of this occurs in the power-struggle between the sky-god Horus, and his uncle Set, the destructive god of the desert. Set's attempts to prove his superiority include schemes of seduction, in which he compliments Horus on his buttocks and tries to anally penetrate him. Unknowingly failing, Set ejaculates between Horus's thighs, allowing Horus to collect his semen to use against him. Set believes that he has conquered Horus by having "performed this aggressive act against him". Horus subsequently throws the semen in the river, so that he may not be said to have been inseminated by Set. Horus then deliberately spreads his own semen on some lettuce, which was Set's favorite food (the Egyptians regarded lettuce as phallic). After Set has eaten the lettuce, they go to the gods to try to settle the argument over the rule of Egypt. The gods first listen to Set's claim of dominance over Horus, and call his semen forth, but it answers from the river, invalidating his claim. Then, the gods listen to Horus' claim of having dominated Set, and call his semen forth, and it answers from inside Set. The association with an evil god such as Set reinforces the negativity towards all participants in homosexual relationships.

Some authors, however, have interpreted an at least more neutral message. In some versions, the act between Horus and Set was consensual, if improper, and Set's consumption of Horus' seed produced Thoth's lunar disc, thus being somewhat positive in outcome. Likewise, Set was not demonised until very late in Egyptian history, and the sexual act has been recorded since the first versions.

Human fertility, a major aspect of Egyptian mythology, often became intertwined with the crop fertility provided by the annual flooding of the river Nile. This connection appeared in the iconography of Nile-gods, such as Hapy, god of the Nile River, and Wadj-wer, god of the Nile Delta, who – although male – were depicted with female attributes such as pendulous breasts, symbolizing the fertility the river provides.

West African, Yoruba and Dahomean (Vodun)

The celestial creator deity of Dahomey mythology is Mawu-Lisa, formed by a merger of the twin brother and sister gods Lisa (the moon) and Mawa (the sun). In combined form, they presented as intersex or transgender (with changing gender). Other androgynous gods include Nana Buluku, the "Great mother" that gave birth to Lisa and Mawa and created the universe, and contains both male and female essences.

The Akan people of Ghana have a pantheon of gods that includes personifications of celestial bodies. These personification manifest as androgynous or transgender deities, and include Abrao (Jupiter), Aku (Mercury), and Awo (Moon).

Possession by spirits is an integral part of Yoruba and other African spiritual traditions. The possessed are usually women, but can also be men, and both genders are regarded as the "bride" of the deity while possessed. The language used to describe possession has a sexual and violent connotation but unlike in Yoruba-derived American religions, there is no link assumed between possession and homosexual or gender variant activity in everyday life.

Zimbabwean
The mythology of the Shona people of Zimbabwe is ruled over by an androgynous creator god called Mwari, who occasionally splits into separate male and female aspects.

Mythologies of Americas

Maya and Aztec
The Mayan god Chin, reported from the sixteenth century, is said to have introduced homoeroticism into the Mayan culture and subsequently became associated with same-sex love. His example inspired noble families to purchase young men as lovers for their sons, creating legal relationships akin to marriage. An important Mayan deity best known from the Classical period (200–900 AD), the so-called Tonsured Maize God, is often depicted in Maya art as an effeminate young man associated with art and dance, and is thought to have constituted a 'third gender'.

The male gods Tezcatlipoca and Yaotl once transformed themselves into women to copulate with Huemac.

Native American and Inuit

In Inuit shamanism, the first two humans were Aakulujjuusi and Uumarnituq, both male. This same-sex couple desired company and decided to mate. This sexual encounter resulted in pregnancy for Uumarnituq. As he was physically not equipped to give birth, a spell was cast that changed his sex, giving him a vagina capable of passing the child. The now-female Uumarnituq was also responsible for introducing war into the world via magic, in order to curb overpopulation. The goddess Sedna is an Inuit creator deity, with dominion of marine animals. She is depicted as gynandrous or hermaphroditic in some myths, and is served by two-spirit shamans. Other myths show Sedna as a bisexual or lesbian, living with her female partner at the bottom of the ocean.

Many stories of Native Americans include Coyote seducing apparently lesbian couples, usually much to his detriment in the end. Other great spirits will sometimes take over a female body if no other presents itself when they wish to seduce a beautiful young woman.

Santería and Candomblé

Santería and Candomblé are syncretic religions derived from Yoruba diasporic beliefs and Catholicism, most prevalent in South Americas, including Cuba and Brazil. Their mythologies have many similarities to that of Yoruba, and contains a pantheon of Oríshas (spirits), comparable to (and often identified with) the lwa of Voodoo.

In one Cuban Santería "pataki", or mythological story, the sea goddess Yemaha is tricked into incestuous sex with her son Shango. To hide her shame at this event, she banished her other two sons, Inle and Abbata, to live at the bottom of the ocean, additionally cutting out Inle's tongue and making Abbata deaf. As a result of their isolation and loneliness, Inle and Abbata become passionate friends and then lovers, able to communicate empathically. This pataki is used to explain the origin of incest, muteness, and deafness in addition to homosexuality.

In Brasil Candomblé, there's Oxumaré.

Haitian Vodou and Louisiana Voodoo

A large number of spirits or deities (lwa) exist in Haitian Vodou and Louisiana Voodoo. These lwa may be regarded as families of individuals or as a singular entity with distinct aspects, with links to particular areas of life.

Some lwa have particular links with magic, ancestor worship or death such as the Gede and Bawon. A number of these are further particularly associated with transgender identities or same-sex interactions. These include Ghede Nibo, a spirit caring for those who die young. He is sometimes depicted as an effeminate drag queen and inspires those he inhabits to lascivious sexuality of all kinds, especially transgender or lesbian behaviour in women. Gede Nibo's parents are Baron Samedi and Maman Brigitte; Baron Samedi is the leader of the Gede and Bawon and is depicted as bisexual dandy or occasionally transgender, wearing a top-hat and frock coat along with a woman's skirt and shoes. Samedi has a tendency toward "lascivious movements" that cross gender boundaries and also imply a lust for anal sex.

Other bawon displaying gay behaviour are Baron Lundy and Baron Limba, who are lovers and teach a type of homoerotic nude wrestling at their school, believed to increase magical potency. Baron Oua Oua, who often manifests with a childlike aspect, has been called the baron "most closely linked to homosexuality" by Voodoo practitioners.

Another lwa, Erzulie, is associated with love, sensuality and beauty. Erzulie can manifest aspects that are LGBT-related, including transgender or amazonian traits, in addition to traditionally feminine guises. When inhabiting men, these aspects can result in transgender or homoerotic behaviour, whereas they may result in lesbianism or anti-male sentiment in women. Erzulie Freda is seen as the protector of gay men, and Erzulie Dantor is associated with lesbians.

Mythologies of Asia

Chinese

Chinese mythology has been described as "rich in stories about homosexuality". The mythological stories and folklore of China reflect ancient Chinese perspectives toward homosexuality, rather than modern views. These myths are greatly influenced by religious beliefs, particularly Taoist and Confucian, and later incorporated Buddhist teachings.

The pre-Confucian and pre-Taoist tradition of China was predominately shamanistic. Male same-sex love was believed to have originated in the mythical south, thus homosexuality is sometimes still called "Southern wind". From this period, numerous spirits or deities were associated with homosexuality, bisexuality and transgender identities. These include Chou Wang, Lan Caihe, Shan Gu, and Yu the Great, and Gun.

Homosexual encounters are common in Chinese folk stories. The animal spirits or fairies often choose same-sex partners, usually young men or boys. According to Xiaomingxiong, one exception to this age preference is the dragon, a powerful mythological beast. Chinese dragons "consistently enjoy sexual relationships with older men", one example being in the tale of "Old Farmer and a Dragon", in which a sixty-year-old farmer is forcibly sodomised by a passing dragon, resulting in wounds from penetration and bites that require medical attention.

Despite the later literature of some Taoist schools disapproval of homosexuality, Tu Er Shen is a deity in Chinese folklore who manages the love and sex between homosexual men. His name literally means "rabbit deity". According to "The Tale of the Rabbit God" in the Zi Bu Yu, Tu Er Shen was originally a man called Hu Tianbao, who fell in love with a handsome young imperial inspector of the Fujian Province. One day Hu Tianbao was caught peeping on the inspector, at which point he confessed his reluctant affections for the other man. The imperial inspector had Hu Tianbao sentenced to death by beating. Since his crime was one of love, underworld officials decided to right the injustice by delegating Hu Tianbao as the god and safeguarder of homosexual affections. In modern times, the priest Lu Weiming founded a temple in Yonghe City, Taiwan, that worships Tu Er Shen and provides spiritual comfort for homosexual Taoists.

For thousands of years, male homosexuality was referred to in literature by alluding to two semi-legendary figures from the early Zhou Dynasty. The first was Mizi Xia and the half-eaten peach which he shared with his lover, the actual historical figure, Duke Ling of Wei. The second was Lord Long Yang, who convinced an unnamed King of Wei to remain faithful to him by comparing himself to a small fish which the King might throw back if a larger fish came along. While both Mizi Xia and Lord Long Yang may have actually existed, nothing is known about them beyond their defining stories, and their presence in Chinese literature was very much that of legendary characters who served as archetypes of homosexual love.

Japanese
According to Japanese folklore and mythology, homosexuality was introduced into the world by Shinu No Hafuri (小竹祝) and his lover Ama No Hafuri (天野祝). These were servants of a primordial goddess, possibly the sun goddess Amaterasu. Upon the death of Shinu, Ama committed suicide from grief, and the couple were buried together in the same grave. In some tellings of the story, the sun did not shine on the burial place until the lovers were disinterred and buried separately, although whether the offense to the sun was due to the homosexual relationship is not stated.

In another tale, Amaterasu retreats from conflict with her brother Susanoo into a cave, depriving the Earth of sunlight and life. In order to coax Amaterasu from the cave, the deity of humour and dance, Ame no Uzume, performs a bawdy sexual dance that involved exposing her breast and vulva, and inviting Amaterasu to admire them. On Amaterasu's stepping out of the cave, the kami Ishi Kori Dome held up a magical mirror, and the combination of the dance and her reflection fascinate Amaterasu so much that she does not notice other spirits closing the cave entrance behind her.

Shinto gods are involved in all aspects of life, including the practice of shudo (traditional pederasty). An overarching patron deity of male-male love and sex, "Shudō Daimyōjin", exists in some folk Shinto sects, but is not a part of the standard Shinto pantheon.

Other kami associated with same-sex love or gender variance include: Shirabyōshi, female kami represented as half-human, half-snake. They are linked to Shinto priestesses of the same name, who perform ritual dances in traditional men's clothing; Ōyamakui, a transgender mountain spirit that protects industry and childbearing; and Inari, the kami of agriculture and rice, who is depicted as various genders, the most common representations being a young female food goddess, an old man carrying rice, and an androgynous bodhisattva. Inari is further associated with foxes and Kitsune, shapeshifting fox trickster spirits. Kitsune sometimes disguise themselves as women, independent of their true gender, in order to trick human men into sexual relations with them. Common belief in medieval Japan was that any woman encountered alone, especially at dusk or night, could be a fox.

Indian

Buddhist

In traditional Thai Theravada Buddhism, accounts propose that "homosexuality arises as a karmic consequence of violating Buddhist proscriptions against heterosexual misconduct" in a previous incarnation. Thai Buddhists also believe the disciple Ānanda to have been reincarnated a number of times as a female, and in one previous life to have been transgender. Ānanda is popular and charismatic, and known for his emotionality. In one story of one of his previous lives, Ānanda was a solitary yogi that fell in love with a Nāga, a serpent king of Indian folklore, who took the form of a handsome youth. The relationship became sexual, causing Ānanda to regretfully break off contact, to avoid distraction from spiritual matters.

According to one legend, male same-sex love was introduced into Japan by the founder of the True Word (Shingon) sect of Japanese esoteric Buddhism, Kūkai. Historians however, point that this is probably not true, since Kūkai was an enthusiastic follower of monastic regulations. Some Bodhisattvas change sexes in different incarnations, which causes some to associate this to homosexuality and transgender identities. Guanyin, Avalokiteśvara, and Tara are known to have different gender representations.

Hindu

Hindu mythology has many examples of deities changing gender, manifesting as different genders at different times, or combining to form androgynous or hermaphroditic beings. Gods change sex or manifest as an Avatar of the opposite sex in order to facilitate sexual congress. Non-divine beings also undergo sex-changes through the actions of the gods, as the result of curses or blessings, or as the natural outcome of reincarnation.

Hindu mythology contains numerous incidents where sexual interactions serve a non-sexual, sacred purpose; in some cases, these are same-sex interactions. Sometimes the gods condemn these interactions but at other times they occur with their blessing.

In addition to stories of gender and sexual variance that are generally accepted by mainstream Hinduism, modern scholars and queer activists have highlighted LGBT themes in lesser known texts, or inferred them from stories that traditionally are considered to have no homoerotic subtext. Such analyses have caused disagreements about the true meaning of the ancient stories.

Philippines

In Tagalog mythology, the hermaphrodite Lakapati is identified as the most important fertility deity in the Tagalog pantheon. A prayer dedicated to Lakapati was recited by children when sowing seeds: "Lakapati, pakanin mo yaring alipin mo; huwag mong gutumin (Lakapati, feed this thy slave; let him not hunger)".

In Suludnon mythology, there are accounts of female binukots (well-kept maidens) who had powers to transition into male warriors. The most famous of which are Nagmalitong Yawa and Matan-ayon. In one epic, after Buyong Humadapnon was captured by the magical binukot Sinangkating Bulawan, the also powerful female binukot, Nagmalitong Yawa, cast her magic and transitioned into a male warrior named Buyong Sumasakay. He  afterwards successfully rescued the warrior Buyong Humadapnon. In a similar epic, the female binukot Matan-ayon, in search of her husband Labaw Donggon, sailed the stormy seas using the golden ship Hulinday together with her less powerful brother-in-law Paubari. Once when she was bathing after sailing far,  Buyong Pahagunong spotted her and tried to make her his bride. The event was followed by a series of combat, where in one instance, Matan-ayon transitioned into the male warrior Buyong Makalimpong. After a series of battles, Labaw Donggon arrives and attacks Buyong Pahagunong, while Buyong Makalimpong once again transitioned into Matan-ayon. Matan-ayon then has a conversation with the supreme goddess Laonsina about why the men are fighting and agree to sit back and watch them if they truly are seeking death.

In Waray mythology, the supreme deity is said to be a single deity with both female and male aspects. The female aspect was Malaon, the ancient and understanding deity, while the male aspect was Makapatag, the fearful and destructive leveler deity.

Abrahamic

Christian

Saints Sergius and Bacchus: Sergius and Bacchus's close relationship has led many modern commentators to believe they were lovers. The most popular evidence for this view is that the oldest text of their martyrology, in the Greek language, describes them as "erastai", or lovers. Historian John Boswell considered their relationship to be an example of an early Christian same-sex union, reflecting his contested view of tolerant early Christian attitudes toward homosexuality. The official stance of the Eastern Orthodox Church is that the ancient Eastern tradition of adelphopoiia, which was done to form a "brotherhood" in the name of God, and is traditionally associated with these two saints, had no sexual implications. In a similar matter regarding paired male saints, Saints Cosmas and Damian have been referred as potentially originally having homoerotic overtones, and that later Christian traditions added them being brothers to conceal that.

Saint Sebastian is a long-standing gay icon. The combination of his strong, shirtless physique, the symbolism of the arrows penetrating his body, and the look on his face of rapturous pain have intrigued artists (gay or otherwise) for centuries, and began the first explicitly gay cult in the 19th century. Richard A. Kaye wrote, "contemporary gay men have seen in Sebastian at once a stunning advertisement for homosexual desire (indeed, a homoerotic ideal), and a prototypical portrait of tortured closet case."

Islamic and Pre-Islamic Arabian

Islamic folk beliefs remain common, such as the myths surrounding the Jinn, long-lived shapeshifting spirits created from "smokeless fire" (Quran 15:27) and which correspond to the second group of angels who were created on the 5th day of Creation in the Jewish Qabalistic text, the Bahir ("The Illumination") which were created from "flameless fire". Some believe their shapeshifting abilities allow them to change gender at will but this is not consistent throughout the Islamic world although their ability to fly and travel exceedingly fast are consistent traits of the Jinn. The word Jinn means "hidden from sight" and they are sometimes considered to be led by Shaytaan (Arabic for "Satan") (who is the Devil also known in Islam as Iblis "he who causes despair"), representing powers of magic and rebellion, and posing as bringers of wealth as the devil acclaim.

These traits are associated with the Jinn on account of Shaytaan's rebellion against the order of Allah to acknowledge Adam's ability to be superior to the Jinn and his refusal to bow down stating that "he was created from fire and Adam was created from clay" (Quran 7:11-12). The ability of the Jinn to travel to the heavens and listen to the discussion of angels and bring back what they overhear and relay it to seers and oracles has linked them with magic (Quran 72:8-10).

Jinn are served by the Al-Jink and Mukhannathun, transgender and homoerotically inclined wanderers with entertainment and spiritual functions. In the pre-Islamic Arabic and Oikoumene cultures, third-gender individuals, such as Mukhannathun were worshippers in widespread Goddess cults. These cults revered a trio of goddesses: Al-lāt, Al-Uzza, and Manāt. which in pre-Islamic Arabia were believed to be daughters of Allah but were denounced as false idols by Muhammad and the Quran (53:19-23).

Arabian mythology also contains magical sex-changing springs or fountains, such as Al-Zahra. Upon bathing in or drinking from Al-Zahra, a person will change sex. The folklore of Swat in northern Pakistan often includes same-sex relationships in which the "beloved" is a handsome younger man or boy.

Judaism

The story of David and Jonathan has been described as "biblical Judeo-Christianity's most influential justification of homoerotic love". The relationship between David and Jonathan is mainly covered in the Old Testament First Book of Samuel, as part of the story of David's ascent to power. The mainstream view found in modern biblical exegesis argues that the relationship between the two is merely a close platonic friendship. However, there has recently been a tradition of interpreting the love between David and Jonathan as romantic or sexual.

Another biblical hero, Noah, best known for his building an ark to save animals and worthy people from a divinely caused flood, later became a wine-maker. One day he drinks too much wine, and fell asleep naked in his tent. When his son Ham enters the tent, he sees his father naked, and Canaan, One of Ham's sons is cursed with banishment. In Jewish tradition, it is also suggested that Ham had anal sex with Noah or castrated him.

Mesopotamian: Sumerian, Akkadian, Babylonian, Assyrian, Phoenician, and Canaanite
The ancient regions of Mesopotamia and Canaan were inhabited by a succession of overlapping civilisations: Sumer, Phoenicia, Akkadia, Babylonia, Assyria. The mythologies of these people were interlinked, often containing the same stories and mythological gods and heroes under different names.

The Sumerian creation myth, "The Creation of Man", from circa 2000 BCE, lists a number of physically differing people created by the goddess Ninmah. These included "the woman who cannot give birth" and "the one who has no male organ or female organ", which have been regarded as being third gender or androgynous. Enki, the supreme god, is accepting of these people and assigns them roles in society as "naditu" (priestesses) and "girsequ" (servants to the king). The Akkadian mythical epic Atrahasis contains another iteration of this story, in which Enki specifically requests that Nintu create a "third-category" of people that includes third-gender people, barren women, and an "infant-stealing demon".

In ancient Mesopotamia, worship of the goddess Inanna included "soothing laments" sung by third gender priests called "gala". According to old Babylonian texts, these priests were created specifically for this purpose by the god Enki. Some gala took female names, and the word itself means "penis+anus", hinting at their androgynous status. The cultural practice, or "me", of androgynous, third-gender or homoerotically inclined priests were part of those said to have been stolen by Innana from Enki in "The Descent of Innana" myth. In the Babylonian Erra myth, the gender of the "kurggaru" and "assinnu" priests was supernaturally changed by the goddess Ishtar, making them feminine.  The changes may also facilitate possession by the goddess, causing a psychological change or prompting physical castration.

The relationship between the semi-divine hero Gilgamesh and his "intimate companion" Enkidu in the Sumerian Epic of Gilgamesh has been interpreted as a sexual one by some modern scholars. Enkidu was created as a companion to Gilgamesh by the goddess Aruru, and civilised by a priestess. As Gilgamesh and Enkidu were of similar ages and status, their relationship has been seen as relatively egalitarian, in contrast with the typically pederastic mode of ancient Greece.

Zoroastrianism

Zoroastrianism has been said to have a "hatred of male anal intercourse". This is reflected in its mythology: When Ahriman, the "Spirit of Aridity and Death" and "Lord of Lies", seeks to destroy the world, he engages in self-sodomy. This homosexual self intercourse causes an "explosion of evil power" and results in the birth of a host of evil minions and demons. Ahriman has also been regarded as the patron of men who partake of homosexual sex. However, this negative portrayal of homosexuality in Zoroastrianism is not found in the Gathas, their original holy book which is said to be the direct sayings of the prophet Zoroaster.

Mythologies of Europe

Celtic
Celtic mythology has no known stories of gay or lesbian relationships nor LGBT characters. Ancient Greek and Roman commentators attribute sexual activity between males, including pederasty, to pre-Christian Celtic tribes. However, Peter Chicheri argues  that homosexual affection was severely punished in Celtic culture due to influence from Christianity, and suggests that any non-procreative sexual experience was later expunged from mythic tales.

 suggest that the heroes and foster-brothers Cúchulainn and Ferdiadh may have had a sexual relationship. The tale has led to comparisons to Greek "warrior-lovers", and Cúchulainn's reaction to the death of Ferdiadh in particular compared to Achilles' lament for Patrocles.

In the Fourth Branch of the Mabinogion of Welsh mythology, Gwydion helps his brother Gilfaethwy rape Goewin, Math's female servant. When Math hears of this, he turns his nephews into a series of mated pairs of animals; Gwydion becomes a stag for a year, then a sow and finally a wolf. Gilfaethwy becomes a hind deer, a boar and a she-wolf. Each year they must mate and produce an offspring which is sent to Math: Hyddwn, Hychddwn and Bleiddwn; after three years Math releases his nephews from their punishment.

Greek and Roman
 
Greek mythology features male same-sex love in many of the constituent myths. These myths have been described as being crucially influential on Western LGBT literature, with the original myths being constantly re-published and re-written, and the relationships and characters serving as icons. In comparison, lesbianism is rarely found in classical myths.

Achilles and Patroclus
Achilles and Troilus
Agamemnon and Argynnus
Ameinias and Narcissus
Apollo and Admetus
Apollo and Adonis
Apollo and Branchus
Apollo and Carnus
Apollo and Cyparissus
Apollo and Helenus
Apollo and Hyacinth
Apollo and Hymenaios
Apollo and Iapis
Ares and Alectryon
Asclepius and Hippolytus
Athena and Myrmex
Athis and Lycabas
Boreas and Hyacinth
Chiron and Dionysus
Cycnus and Phaethon
Cycnus and Phylius
Cydon and Clytius
Dionysus and Ampelus
Dionysus and Prosymnus
Eurybarus and Alcyoneus
Hephaestus and Peleus
Heracles and Abderus
Heracles and Eurystheus
Heracles and Hylas
Heracles and Iolaus
Hermes and Amphion
Hermes and Crocus
Hermes and Perseus
Hermes and Pollux
Hesperus and Hymenaeus
Hymenaeus and Argynnus
Hypnos and Endymion
Ianthe and Iphis
Kalamos and Karpos
Laius and Chrysippus
Marsyas and Olympus
Minos and Ganymede
Minos and Miletus
Minos and Theseus
Nisus and Euryalus
Orestes and Pylades
Orpheus and the Thracians
Orpheus and Kalais
Pan and Daphnis
Paris and Antheus
Polyphemus and Silenus
Poseidon and Nerites
Poseidon and Pelops
Polyeidos and Glaucus
Rhadamanthus and Talos
Sarpedon and Miletus
Silvanus and Cyparissus
Thamyris and Hyacinth
Theseus and Pirithous
Zephyrus and Cyparissus
Zephyrus and Hyacinth
Zeus (Artemis) and Callisto
Zeus and Ganymede

Apollo, an eternal beardless youth himself, had the most male lovers of all the Greek gods, as could be expected from a god who presided over the palaestra. In spite of having no male lovers himself, the love god Eros was sometimes considered patron of pederastic love between males. Aphroditus was an androgynous Aphrodite from Cyprus, in later mythology became known as Hermaphroditus the son of Hermes and Aphrodite.

Thamyris, the Thracian singer who developed love for Hyacinth, is said to have been the first man to fall in love with another man. In Ovid's Metamorphoses, the characters Iphis and Caeneus change sex.

Norse
In the Norse sagas and laws, men who have sex with men in the active or "manly" role were not discriminated as the passive partner in homosexual intercourse (see Ergi).

Georges Dumézil suggested that Freyr, a Norse god of fertility, may have been worshiped by a group of homosexual or effeminate priests, as suggested by Saxo Grammaticus in his Gesta Danorum.

Some of the Norse gods were capable of changing sex at will. For example Loki, the trickster god, frequently disguised himself as a woman. In one myth, he turned himself into a mare and, after having sex with the stallion Svaðilfari, he gave birth to Sleipnir, an eight-legged foal. Odin was practiced in woman's magic. Though it is unknown as to why magic was thought of as effeminate in this time Odin was accused of ergi.

The sociologist David F. Greenberg points out:

Mythologies of Oceania

Australian Aboriginal
The indigenous population of Australia have a shamanistic religion, which includes a pantheon of gods. The rainbow serpent god Ungud has been described as androgynous or transgender. Shaman identify their erect penises with Ungud, and his androgyny inspires some to undergo ceremonial subincision of the penis. Angamunggi is another transgender rainbow-serpent god, worshipped as a "giver of life".

Other Australian mythological beings include Labarindja, blue-skinned wild women or "demon women" with hair the colour of smoke. Stories about them show them to be completely uninterested in romance or sex with men, and any man forcing his attention upon them could die, due to the "evil magic in their vaginas". They are sometimes depicted as gynandrous or intersex, having both a penis and a vagina. This is represented in ritual by having their part played by men in women's clothes.

Pacific Island: Celebes, Vanuatu, Borneo and the Philippines
Third gender, or gender variant, spiritual intermediaries are found in many Pacific island cultures, including the bajasa of the Toradja Bare'e people of Celebes, the bantut of the Taosug people of the south Philippines, and the bayoguin of the pre-Christian Philippines. These shamans are typically biologically male but display feminine behaviours and appearance. The pre-Christian Philippines had a polytheistic religion, which included the transgender or hermaphroditic gods Bathala and Malyari, whose names means "Man and Woman in One" and "Powerful One" respectively; these gods are worshipped by the Bayagoin.

The Big Nambas of Vanuatu have the concept of divinely approved-of homoerotic relationships between men, with the older partner called the "dubut". This name is derived from the word for shark, referring to the patronage of the shark-human hydrid creator god Qat.

Among their pantheon of deities, the Ngaju Dayak of Borneo worship Mahatala-Jata, an androgynous or transgender god. The male part of this god is Mahatala, who rules the Upperworld, and is depicted as a hornbill living above the clouds on a mountain-top; the female part is Jata, who rules the Underworld from under the sea in the form of a water-snake. These two manifestations are linked via a jewel-encrusted bridge that is seen in the physical world as a rainbow. Mahatala-Jata is served by "balian", female hierodules, and "basir" transgender shamans metaphorically described as "water snakes which are at the same time hornbills". Similar transgender shamans, the "manang bali", are found in the Iban Dayak people. Girls fated to become manang bali may first dream of becoming a woman and also of being summoned by the god/dess Menjaya Raja Manang or the goddess Ini. Menjaya Raja Manang began existence as a male god, until his brother's wife became sick. This prompted Menjara into becoming the world's first healer, allowing her to cure her sister-in-law, but this treatment also resulted in Menjara changing into a woman or androgynous being.

Polynesian: Hawaiian and Māori
Polynesian religions feature a complex pantheon of deities. Many of these gods refer to their companions of either sex as "aikane", a term encompassing passionate friendship and sexual-love, often in bisexual contexts.

Wahineomo, a goddess of Hawaiian mythology whose name means "thrush woman", is depicted in relationships with other goddesses Hi'iaka and Hopoe. When Hi'iaka was suspected of infidelity with her sister Pele's husband, the volcano goddess Pele killed Hi'iaka's beloved Hopoe by covering her in lava. In addition to Wahineomo and Hopoe, Hi'iaka had lesbian relationships with the fern goddess Pauopalae and Pele-devotee Omeo. Omeo was part of the retinue that brought the bisexual Prince Lohiau to Pele after his death. During his life Lohiau was the lover of both the female Pele and male Paoa.

Other Polynesian LGBT figures include the Hawaiian Haakauilanani, a male servant and lover to the "Earth mother" creator goddess Papa and her husband Wakea. Non-divine LGBT characters also exist in Polynesian mythology, such as the (male) shaman Pakaa and his chief and lover Keawe-Nui-A-'umi, and the famed fisherman Nihooleki, who was married to a woman but also had a relationship with the pig god Kamapua'a. Kamapua'a was also responsible for sending the love-god Lonoikiaweawealoha to seduce Pele's brother gods Hiiakaluna and Hiiakalalo, hence distracting them from attacking him. Kamapua'a's other male lovers included Limaloa, the bisexual god of the sea and mirages.

Hi'iaka, a daughter or sister of Pele had "Aikane" (from: "ai", meaning: [intimate sexual relationship]; "kane", [man, husband, consort]) relationships with several female lovers including Hopoe, Omeo, Wahineʻomaʻo, and Pauo-Palae.

The Healer Stones of Kapaemahu tells the story of four māhū - individuals of dual male and female mind, heart, and spirit - who long ago brought healing arts from Tahiti to Hawai'i.  Before they left, they used special dual male-female tiki to transfer their powers to four large boulders that the people brought to Waikiki.  These stones still exist on Waikiki Beach, and may be the only monument in the world to honor and uplift gender fluidity.

See also

Religion and homosexuality
 Queer theology
 LGBT literature
 LGBT history
 LGBT themes in speculative fiction

Notes

References

Citations

Bibliography

External links

 
Mythology
Mythology